In the Wet is a novel by Nevil Shute that was first published in the United Kingdom in 1953. It contains many of the typical elements of a hearty and adventurous Shute yarn such as flying, the future, mystic states, and ordinary people doing extraordinary things.

Plot summary
The story is opened by its initial narrator – an Anglican priest in the Bush Brotherhood named Roger Hargreaves – who describes his ordinary circumstances in a large parish of the Queensland outback in 1953. As part of his duties, he has to minister to the dying and this brings him into contact with an aged, alcoholic, opium-smoking, diseased, ex-pilot and ex-ringer named Stevie.

Caught in Stevie's squalid cabin in a heavy rainy season, Hargreaves struggles with recurring malaria whilst on deathwatch for Stevie. As both men are in altered mental states the story shifts and Stevie becomes David 'Nigger' Anderson, a decorated member of the Royal Australian Air Force, telling his story to Hargreaves. But this is a story set 30 years in the future, in 1983.

David Anderson is a quadroon, of mixed European and Aboriginal ancestry. As a first rate pilot he is chosen by his country to be a member of an elite test pilot team in the UK. Although of humble origins, Anderson has advanced quickly in the RAAF and is soon offered a position commanding one of two aircraft of the Queen's Flight.

The England of the 1983 in the story is a technically advanced country that has been abused and bled dry by Socialism. Austerity is the watchword, and rationing is still in force. It is an England in which the Royal Family is revered by the common people, but abused by politicians who use them as whipping boys for the economic woes of England. When the politicians attempt indirectly to control the foreign travel of the monarch by curtailing her use of UK government aircraft, the Canadian and Australian governments each donate a modern jet transport to the Queen's Flight, provide for operating expenses, and furnish crews. Anderson is chosen as the captain of the Australian plane. Both Canada and Australia are heavily royalist countries, and Anderson is shocked at one point by the suggestion that Australia could become a republic. Both are democracies, though subject to the "multiple vote"—everyone gets one vote, but other votes can be earned by individuals, up to a maximum of seven. Anderson himself has three votes in Australian elections.

At first absorbed by the job, Anderson slowly becomes aware of what is going on around him.  He sees the Secretary of State for Air, Lord Coles, inspect the advanced aircraft, and insist that a signal gun be placed in the radio-equipped aircraft in case it needs to land in a field. The Prime Minister, Iorweth Jones, is more intelligent, but only interested in scoring political points.

The Royal family, though, is delighted at the gift of the aircraft, and the middle-aged Queen and Consort come down to inspect them.

Anderson repeatedly meets, and slowly falls for, a junior secretary to the Queen, Rosemary, daughter of an Oxford don, who is assigned to help streamline the administrative aspects of the Commonwealth aircraft joining the Queen's Flight.  Anderson learns of the difficult political situation the Queen is faced with.

The Queen's visit to Canada in the Canadian craft coincides with another attack on the Royal Family by Labour politicians. The Prince of Wales has Anderson fly him to Ottawa so he can meet with the Queen.  It is later made clear that the Prince carries an ultimatum from himself and his sister (the Queen has only two children)—they will not take the job of monarch as it now stands.

Anderson is ordered to fly the Queen and her entourage, including Rosemary, not back to England, but on to Australia to meet with politicians there.  En route, they have a lengthy refueling delay on Christmas Island, allowing the Queen to relax a bit—until local officials show up with their wives, in formal dress.  Anderson, struck with food poisoning, dreams of the scene with Hargreaves and Stevie in the cabin in the wet.  After he recovers, the party move on to Australia.  The Queen meets not only with current Australian politicians but with elder statesmen Sir Robert Menzies and Arthur Calwell (active politicians in real-life 1953).  After the meetings the Queen is flown back to England, but ground control diverts the flight hundreds of miles to Yorkshire on the pretext that the well-qualified Australian airmen are not qualified to land at a commercial airport—Heathrow—in poor weather; in reality the diversion to Yorkshire is apparently intended to inconvenience the Queen. After Royal intervention the crews are all granted accreditation as civil aviators without further ado.

Anderson asks Rosemary to marry him, but she refuses so long as the Queen needs her. She arranges for Anderson to meet her father, a political scientist. Her father inadvertently reveals that the Queen is contemplating having a Governor General of Britain who will deal with the politicians, with the monarch devoted to Commonwealth affairs, to make the monarchy bearable for her and her family.

The Queen announces this on her Christmas broadcast, and makes it clear that she and her family will not return to Britain without the country having undergone political reforms, meaning both the multiple vote, and the installation of a Governor General for the United Kingdom as a necessary buffer between Monarch and Parliament, whose behaviour and treatment of the Queen has become both a constitutional and personal affront prior to this declaration.

Though David takes every precaution to protect the aircraft, which takes off with the Queen soon afterwards, a sixth sense, deriving from his Aboriginal heritage, tells him something is wrong.  He searches the party's luggage, and finds a sealed metal box, obviously a bomb.  It seems impossible to get the box outside due to winds, but through skilled flying, he is able to create the right conditions.  The Queen swears all to secrecy, and awards David the Seventh Vote, given only by Royal commission.

The party reaches Australia safely.  Meanwhile, in Britain, the new Governor General has summoned Parliament to debate the multiple vote.  Prime Minister Jones' government falls, and a new government, still Labour, is expected to institute the political reform.  Now that the Queen is no longer in a crisis situation, Rosemary can leave the royal employment and marry David.

In an epilogue, the framing story resumes. Stevie has died peaceably and an exhausted Hargreaves tries to separate dream from reality.  This becomes more difficult when the child who will grow to be David Anderson is presented to him for christening.

DeHavilland Ceres
The fictional DeHavilland Ceres flown by the Queen's Flight appears to be based on the concept of the Avro Atlantic, a civilianised jet airliner version of the Avro Vulcan jet bomber, designed for intercontinental travel. This was a design concept at the time the novel was written, and did not enter production.

Multiple vote
Perhaps the most interesting (and enduring) feature of the book is the "multiple vote", seen as a necessary reform of democracy.  A person can have up to seven votes.  Everyone gets a basic vote.  Other votes can be earned for education (including a commission in the armed forces), earning one's living overseas for two years, raising two children to the age of 14 without divorcing, being an official of a Christian church, or having a high earned income.  The seventh vote, which in the book is awarded to David Anderson for his heroism, is only given at the Queen's discretion by Royal Charter.

Plural voting was possible in Britain in the past.  Until the late 1940s, the graduates of all British universities sent representatives to Parliament, and property owners could vote both where they lived and where they owned property; a university-educated property owner could therefore have three votes.  The graduates of the National University of Ireland and of Trinity College are still represented in the upper house of Ireland's parliament. Mark Twain had used the idea of multiple votes for merit in his short story "The Curious Republic of Gondour".

Governor Generalship for the United Kingdom
As a component of the Queen's declaration, one of the mandated reforms is the installation of a Governor General for the United Kingdom, in the wake of an increasingly assertive and aggressive Labour government administering the country in the wake of the Third World War. As the Queen is monarch of the Commonwealth, there are real constitutional questions as to whether proportional representation and presence in Commonwealth realms of the Sovereign takes precedence over the comparatively smaller population of United Kingdom in comparison.

During the novel, the growing disaffection for both Monarch and Prime Minister, as well as the threat by the Prince of Wales to refuse the throne if offered it due to the behaviour of the Labour Government requires a means of settlement. The only solution, in the end, is to give rise to a buffer between Crown and Parliament - a Governor General.

Unlike a Monarch, the Governor General has the capacity to give a direct response to the Government, without fear of political rift developing with the Crown, as this post is intermediary. If a Governor-General's political conduct is sufficiently poor, replacement by appointment by the Crown is a realistic procedure, and is outside of the control of Parliament.

In addition, a Governor General can sit within Parliament as the Monarch's representative, and is also permitted as in other Commonwealth realms, to address Parliament, which the Monarch is normally not expected to do other than ceremoniously. The Governor General can, as the Monarch does only in a private audience, the capacity to be consulted, to advise, and to warn - but with the difference that this would be done within the public sphere, in the presence of the entire Parliament, rather than in the confines of the Private Audience between Prime Minister and Sovereign.

This change would then permit the reform of the political process, and expose the behaviour of an antagonistic government and Prime Minister to the entire Parliament, and House of Lords, moderating their conduct through exposure of intent.

References

External links
 

1953 Australian novels
Novels by Nevil Shute
Aviation novels
Heinemann (publisher) books
1953 British novels
Fiction set in 1983
Novels set in the 1980s
Novels set in Queensland